The 22447 / 22448 Khajuraho Uttar Pradesh Sampark Kranti Link Express is a Superfast train belonging to Northern Railway zone that runs between  and  in India. It is currently being operated with 22447/22448 train numbers on a daily basis.

Service

The 22447/Uttar Pradesh Sampark Kranti Express has an average speed of 55 km/hr and covers 604 km in 11h 5m. The 22448/Uttar Pradesh Sampark Kranti Express has an average speed of 58 km/hr and covers 604 km in 10h 25m.

via:-

Route & Halts 

The train halts at following stations:

 
 
 Kulpahar
 
 Mauranipur

Coach composition

The train has standard ICF rakes with max speed of 110 kmph. The train consists of 10 coaches:

 1 AC First class and AC II tier composite (HAE)
 1 AC II Tier and AC III Tier composite (AB1)
 1 AC III Tier (B2)
 2 Sleeper coaches (S5, S6)
 3 General Unreserved
 2 Seating cum Luggage Rake

Traction

The train is hauled by a Jhansi-based WDM-3A diesel locomotive from Khajuraho to Mahoba. At Mahoba it reverses direction and is hauled by Tughlakabad-based WAP-7 electric locomotive power the train for its reminder journey until Hazrat Nizamuddin.

Rake sharing

The train is attached with 12447/12448 Uttar Pradesh Sampark Kranti Express at Mahoba.

Direction reversal

The train reverses its direction 1 times:

See also 

 Khajuraho railway station
 Hazrat Nizamuddin railway station
 Uttar Pradesh Sampark Kranti Express

References

External links 

 22447/Uttar Pradesh Sampark Kranti Express India Rail Info
 22448/Uttar Pradesh Sampark Kranti Express India Rail Info

Transport in Khajuraho
Transport in Delhi
Sampark Kranti Express trains
Rail transport in Uttar Pradesh
Rail transport in Madhya Pradesh
Rail transport in Delhi
Railway services introduced in 2005